Shannon Stewart is a Canadian writer living in Vancouver, British Columbia.

Writing
Stewart's first collection of poetry, The Canadian Girl, was published in 1998, and was a finalist for the Milton Acorn People's Poetry Award and Gerald Lampert Award for Best First Book of Poetry. Her second collection, Penny Dreadful, was published in 2008 and was shortlisted for a ReLit Award. One of Stewart's tabloid poems inspired by the Weekly World News tabloid was metafictively featured in its online site.

Poetry titles
The Canadian Girl (1998) 
Penny Dreadful (2008)

Children's titles
Sea Crow (2004) 
Alphabad (2005) 
Captain Jake (2009)

References

Year of birth missing (living people)
Living people
Canadian women poets
20th-century Canadian poets
21st-century Canadian poets
20th-century Canadian women writers
21st-century Canadian women writers